Mary of France may refer to:

People
 Marie de France, medieval poet
 Marie of France, Duchess of Brabant (1198–1224), daughter of Philip II of France
 Marie of France, Countess of Champagne (1145–1198), daughter of Louis VII of France, wife of Henry I of Champagne
 Marie of France, Duchess of Bar (1344–1404), daughter of John II of France, wife of Robert I of Bar
 Marie of Valois, Prioress of Poissy (1393–1438), daughter of Charles VI of France
 Marie de Valois (1444–1473), natural daughter of Charles VII of France
 Marie of Anjou (1404–1463), queen consort of Charles VII of France
 Mary Tudor, Queen of France (1496–1533), queen consort of Louis XII of France
 Mary, Queen of Scots, (1542–1587) queen consort of Francis II of France

Other
 Mary, Queen of France (novel), a novel by Jean Plaidy

See also
 Marie of Valois (disambiguation)